Hopea coriacea is a species of plant in the family Dipterocarpaceae. It is found in Peninsular Malaysia and Borneo.

References

coriacea
Trees of Peninsular Malaysia
Trees of Borneo
Critically endangered flora of Asia
Taxonomy articles created by Polbot
Taxa named by William Burck